Shorea longiflora is a species of tropical lowland rainforest tree in the family Dipterocarpaceae. It is endemic to Borneo.

The IUCN lists this species as threatened.

References

longiflora
Endemic flora of Borneo
Trees of Borneo
Taxonomy articles created by Polbot